Benjamin Elazari Volcani (Hebrew: בנימין אלעזרי-וולקני, born 4 January 1915, died 1 February 1999) was an Israeli microbiologist who discovered life in the Dead Sea and pioneered biological silicon research at Scripps Institution of Oceanography at the University of California, San Diego.

Biography
Benjamin Elazari Volcani was born January 4, 1915, in Ben Shemen, in what was then the Ottoman Empire the son of Yitzhak Elazari Volcani (1880–1955) and Sarah Krieger. He had two sisters, Ruth and Zafrira. His father, as a young Zionist in Lithuania, had studied agricultural economics, and agronomy before immigrating to Palestine in 1908, where he became a world leader in these fields. Itzhak Elazari Volcani is considered the founder of modern agriculture in Israel. The Volcani Institute of Agricultural Research is named for his father, as is Beit Elazari, a moshav in central Israel.

As a teenager Benjamin Volcani wanted to become an actor, but as an undergraduate became interested in biology. He received his Master of Science degree in microbiology from Hebrew University of Jerusalem in 1936. That same year, he found that the Dead Sea, so called because it was thought to be too salty to sustain life, in fact supports several types of microorganisms now classified as halophilic archaea. Both his M.Sc. degree (1936) and Ph.D. (1940) were from the Hebrew University, Jerusalem. His Ph.D. thesis was the first ever written in Hebrew (“Studies of the Microflora of the Dead Sea”).

His discovery of microorganisms in the Dead Sea was the focal point of his work from 1936 to 1945 and was the theme of his doctoral thesis. From 1939 to 1958 Volcani served on the staff of the Weizmann Institute of Science in Rehovot, and in 1948 he was appointed head of the Institute's Section of Microbiology. During the 1940s, he also spent time in the United States as a research fellow at the University of California, Berkeley; Hopkins Marine Station of Stanford University; the California Institute of Technology; and the University of Wisconsin.

In March 1948, Volcani married Eleanor Susan Brownell Anthony "Toni" Solomons Jackson, the daughter of Theodore Solomons, in New York City. After their marriage, the couple settled in Israel. Volcani smuggled in a small field-radar unit in his baggage. His wife remembers walking to the market in Rehovot, about one mile (1.6 km) from their house, and diving into foxholes along the road when pairs of small two-seater Arab planes came over on bombing runs. They came in low, each dropping its  bomb as it flew off. The first bomb of the war fell on the street in front of the Volcani’s house. Volcani and his wife had one child, Yanon Volcani, born in Israel in January 1949. Yanon is a clinical psychologist practicing in San Diego, California.

Volcani died on February 6, 1999, in La Jolla, California.

Scientific career
In 1939, Volcani became a member of the Sieff Institute in Rehovot, later renamed the Weizmann Institute of Science. He headed its laboratory of microbiology until 1959, when he joined the faculty at Scripps Institution of Oceanography. He decided to focus on diatoms, one of the very few organisms that use silicon rather than calcium for their skeletal structures. Silicon is one of the most abundant elements on earth, and in 1959 no one was working on its metabolism. The biology of silicon had been shunned by all biochemists, the dogma being that it was inert. Volcani realized that diatoms, whose life cycle is based on silicon, provided an ideal experimental canvas. From 1959 onward, his lab made multifaceted discoveries centered on biologically active silicon in marine diatoms. The lab became a focal point for the study of silicon metabolism and biomineralization at the molecular level, embracing experimental techniques, from elegant electron microscopy of diatom shells to gene cloning and the expression of silicon transporting proteins in frog eggs.

He invented ways to synchronize the cell division cycle of diatoms. He showed that silicon activates the gene coding for the polymerase enzyme that copies diatom DNA. He was also interested in the toxic and pathological effects of polysilicates, such as talc and asbestos, on mammalian cells in tissue culture, and was the first to do tissue culture at Scripps. He spent a one-year sabbatical at the University of Swansea studying the effects of polysilicates on mammalian cells, and published papers on the uptake of silicic acid by rat liver mitochondria.

His studies of silicon metabolism often involved growing diatoms of various species in different concentrations of silicon and then studying the effect on specific metabolic pathways. These experiments studied pigments, lipids, amino acids, cell wall synthesis, DNA synthesis, ribosomes, sodium-potassium membrane pumps, cell membrane characterization, glycolate metabolism, cyclic nucleotide metabolism, protein kinases, and a catalog of genes that were turned on by silicon. Several papers centered on the effects of silicon on photorespiration in diatoms.

He published over 100 papers related to silicon metabolism and co-edited Silicon and Siliceous Structures in Biological Systems (Springer, 1981). He received  continuing grants from the National Institutes of Health for 32 years. He trained many doctoral students and had a constant stream of postdoctoral associates and visitors passing through the lab until his retirement in 1985.

Notes

References

Bibliography
Dexter, Franklin Bowditch.Biographical sketches of the graduates of Yale college with annals of the college history ... Volume 3 of Biographical Sketches of the Graduates of Yale College with Annals of the College History  Publisher: Holt & Company, 1903.
Jordan, John W. Genealogical and personal history of the Allegheny Valley, Pennsylvania. New York: Lewis Historical Pub. Company 1913.
Railsback, Brian E; Michael J. Meyer A John Steinbeck encyclopedia Publisher: Greenwood Publisher Group, 2006 
Raymond, Marcius Denison. Gray genealogy : being a genealogical record and history of the descendants of John Gray, of Beverly, Mass., and also including sketches of other Gray families. New York: Higginson Book Company, 1887.
Raymond, Marcius D. Sketch of Rev. Blackleach Burritt and related Stratford families : a paper read before the Fairfield County Historical Society, at Bridgeport, Conn., Friday evening, Feb. 19, 1892. Bridgeport : Fairfield County Historical Society 1892.
Sargent, Shirley. Solomons of the Sierra: The Pioneer of the John Muir Trail Yosemite, California. Publisher: Flying Spur Press , 1990.
Siemiatkoski, Donna Holt.The Descendants of Governor Thomas Welles of Connecticut, 1590–1658, and His Wife, Alice Tomes Baltimore: Publisher Gateway Press, 1990.
Volcani, Benjamin Elazari. Studies of the microflora of the Dead Sea: (Dissertation) Hebrew University, Jerusalem, 1940.
Wineapple, Brenda.Sister Brother: Gertrude and Leo Stein   Publisher: Lincoln, Nebraska. University of Nebraska Press, 2008

External links 
Volcani Center
 Aharon Oren & Antonio Ventosa: Benjamin Elazari Volcani (1915–1999): Sixty–three years of studies of the microbiology of the Dead Sea (PDF-Datei; 53 kB)

1915 births
1999 deaths
American microbiologists
Hebrew University of Jerusalem alumni
Israeli microbiologists
Israeli expatriates in the United States
20th-century Israeli Jews
Jewish-American history
Jewish American scientists
Jewish American writers
People from Jerusalem
Writers from San Diego
20th-century American Jews